Alan Finlayson is a British political theorist and political scientist. He is Professor of Political and Social Theory at The University of East Anglia in the United Kingdom, having previously taught in the Department of Political and Cultural Studies at Swansea University, and the Department of Politics and International Relations at Queen's University Belfast. He is a leading advocate of rhetorical political analysis and of its importance for the study of British politics.

Rhetorical Political Analysis 
Finlayson is a noted advocate of the development of Rhetorical Political Analysis within British Political Studies. He promotes the close study of political speech and argument on the grounds that this is a way of understanding the history and development of political ideologies. He is responsible for the website British Political Speech which archives political speeches and promotes the study of political oratory in the UK. In 2015 his essay "Proving, Pleasing and Persuading? Rhetoric in Contemporary British Politics" was awarded the Bernard Crick Prize for the best article in the journal Political Quarterly.

Responsibilities 
Finlayson was convenor of the Post-Structuralism and Radical Politics specialist group of the Political Studies Association from 1999 to 2009. He is currently Treasurer of the Rhetoric and Politics Specialist Group of the PSA, a member of the Rhetoric Society of America's Internationalization Task Force and of the steering group of the Rhetoric Society of Europe. He is also a Trustee of the Barry Amiel and Norman Melburn Trust. and a Director of the left-wing publisher Lawrence and Wishart.

Selected bibliography

Media journal articles

Academic journal articles 
 
 
 
 Atkins, J., Finlayson, A.  (2013)  ‘... A 40-Year-Old Black Man Made the Point to Me’: Everyday Knowledge and the Performance of Leadership in Contemporary British Politics in Political Studies  61.  pp. 161–177. 
Finlayson, A.  (2014)  Proving, Pleasing and Persuading? Rhetoric in Contemporary British Politics  in The Political Quarterly  85.  pp. 428–436

References

External links
Alan Finlayson's Webpage at The University of East Anglia
Profile at openDemocracy

Year of birth missing (living people)
Living people
Alumni of Queen's University Belfast
Alumni of Trinity College, Cambridge
British political philosophers
British political scientists
Academics of the University of East Anglia